Collector Gari Bharya is a 2010 Telugu-language drama film directed by Tekula Kripakar Reddy. The film stars Bhumika Chawla and Prakash Raj. It was released on 5 November 2010. The film was dubbed and released in Tamil as Penn Adimai Illai.

Cast

Credited cast:
Bhumika Chawla as Indira (Indhu)
Prakash Raj as Gautham
Brahmanandam
Tanikella Bharani as Politician
Babu Mohan as Politician
Paruchuri Venkateswara Rao 
Dharmavarapu Subrahmanyam
M. S. Narayana
Venu Madhav
Kondavalasa Lakshmana Rao
Vizag Prasad
Malladi Raghava
Sivaparvathy 
Delhi Rajeswari
Ashmita Karnani
Duvvasi Mohan
 Shankar Melkote

Production
Collector Gari Bharya marked the directorial debut of Tekula Kripakar Reddy, US based businessman who earlier assisted Dasari Narayana Rao. The filming was held in places like Vizag, Rajamundry and Hyderabad.

Soundtrack
Soundtrack was composed by Chinna. The audio was released at Taj Deccan, Hyderabad.
"Sai Baba Karuninchu" - K. S. Chithra
"Pachhi Mirchinira" - Suchitra
"No No" - M. M. Manasi
"Manasulona" - K. S. Chithra
"Cheyi Cheyi" - K. S. Chithra

Reception
123Telugu wrote " It is only the actors who make the movie watchable. The director should work on establishing his major problem correctly and then give an acceptable solution. Collector Gaari Bharya suffers from these two highly". Full Hyderabad wrote "Collector Gari Bharya is a simplified view of the problems married women face, and offers even more simplistic solutions". Bharat Student wrote "The director has come up with a rather biased theme and though the presentation was good, the narrative was okay. The dialogues were good at places, the script was okay, the screenplay was average".

References

External links

2010 films
Indian drama films
Films about women in India
2010 directorial debut films
2010s Telugu-language films
2010 drama films